The 9K111 Fagot ("bassoon") is a second-generation tube-launched semi-automatic command to line of sight (SACLOS) wire-guided anti-tank missile system of the Soviet Union for use from ground or vehicle mounts. The 9K111 Fagot missile system was developed by the Tula KBP Design Bureau for Instrument Building. 9M111 is the designation for the missile. Its NATO reporting name is AT-4 Spigot.

Development
The 9K111 Fagot was developed by the Tula Machinery Design Bureau (Tula KBP) and development began in 1962 with the aim of producing the next generation of SACLOS anti-tank guided missile (ATGM) for use in two roles: as man portable and tank destroyer. The 9K111 Fagot was developed alongside the 9M113 Konkurs; both missiles use similar technology, differing in size only, and can use the same launchers. The missile entered service in 1970.

History
The anti-tank platoon of a Soviet BTR equipped motor rifle battalion had two (sometimes three) ATGM squads, each with two 9K111 Fagot teams. The team consisted of three men; the gunner carries the 9P135 launcher and tripod as a back pack, and the other two men each carry two launch tubes. The men also carry assault rifles, but do not carry a rocket-propelled grenade (RPG), because unlike the earlier missiles there is only a small deadzone within which the missile cannot engage the target. Besides the four missiles carried by each team, each squad would normally have an extra eight missiles carried in their transport, usually a BTR. It can also be deployed from the BMP-1P, BMD-1P, BTR-D and UAZ-469.

North Korea was said to have acquired a number of the systems during the late 1980s until the 2000s. These were subsequently reverse-engineered under the designation Bulsae-2. It was advertised under designation AT-4MLB by North Korean proxy company GLOCOM, in brochure it was stated that it is controlled by laser beam guidance method, which was an upgrade designated Bulsae-3. Its use was first reported in 2014 in the ranks of the Izz ad-Din al-Qassam Brigades and the Al-Nasser Salah al-Deen Brigades.

Description

The missile is stored and carried in a container/launch tube. It is fired from a 9P135 launcher post, a simple tripod. A 9S451 guidance box is fitted to the tripod with the missile sitting just above. The 9Sh119 sight is fitted to the left side (from the gunner's POV). The complete launcher system weighs . The gunner lies prone while firing. The launcher post can traverse through 360 degrees horizontally, and +/− 20 degrees in elevation. The sight has a magnification of 10x and a 5 degree field of view. Up to three missiles a minute can be fired from a launcher post.

The system uses a gas generator to push the missile out of the launch tube, which exits from the rear of the launch tube in a manner similar to a recoilless rifle. This initial high speed reduces the missile's deadzone, since it can be launched directly at the target, rather than in an upward arc.

The launcher tracks the position of an incandescent infrared bulb on the back of the missile relative to the target and transmits appropriate commands to the missile via a thin wire that trails behind the missile. The SACLOS guidance system has many benefits over manual command to line of sight (MCLOS), with the accuracy of the system stated as 90% in some sources, though its performance is probably comparable to the TOW or the later SACLOS versions of the 9M14 Malyutka.

Models

Missile
 9M111 Fagot (NATO: AT-4 Spigot and AT-4A Spigot A) Entered service in 1970. Maximum range , minimum . Warhead 400 mm versus RHA or 200 mm toward armour inclined at 60°.
 9M111-2 Fagot (NATO: AT-4B Spigot B) Slightly improved version.
 9M111M Faktoriya/Faktoria (Trading post) or Fagot-M (NATO: AT-4C Spigot C) Improved motor, longer guidance wire. Maximum range , minimum . Improved single HEAT warhead; penetration 600 mm versus RHA or 230 mm toward armour inclined at 60° (some publications claimed 9M111M to have tandem HEAT warhead).

Launcher
 9P135 . Can only fire the 9M111 Fagot series.
 9P135M Can fire the 9M111 Fagot (NATO: AT-4 Spigot) series as well as the 9K113 Konkurs (NATO: AT-5 Spandrel) series missiles.
 9P135M1 Updated version of the 9P135.
 9P135M2 Updated version of the 9P135.
 9P135M3 Deployed in the early 1990s. Adds  TPVP thermal imaging night sight – range  at night.
 9S451M2 A launcher with a night sight featuring an anti-dazzle system has been developed.

Operators

Current operators
  – 100
  – 2040 delivered between 1995-1996 for BMP-2 IFV.
  – 100
 
 
  – 52
  – 500
  – 222
  – 119
  – 100
  – 50
  – 50
  – Several hundred 9P135M-1 launchers (withdrawn from service) and AT-4B as well as AT-5A missiles, known as PstOhj 82 and PstOhj 82M respectively.
 
  – 262 (acquired from former East German stocks)
  – 50
  – 100
 
  – During Saddam's era.
  - 200 in 2010
  – 100
  – 100
  – used on BMP-1
  – 10
  – Unknown, reversed engineered under designation of Bulsae-2
  – acquired in the 1980s
  – 1,000. 100 more systems delivered in August 2019 with a thermal camera and another 150 units delivered totally in February and May 2021.
  – 250
  – 50
 Free Syrian Army and other rebel groups – large numbers
  – 100
  – 800
  – 100

Former operators
  – all transferred to both successors after Dissolution of Czechoslovakia.
  – Passed on to Germany after the German Reunification.
  – all retired soon after German Reunification.
  – withdrawn and stored since early 2010s.
  – replaced by Spike missile.
  – passed to successor states.

Non-state actors
 Hamas – Known to use Bulsae-2s
  – Unknown number captured
 PKK/YPG
  Polisario front

See also
 List of Russian weaponry

References

Sources
 Hull, A.W., Markov, D.R., Zaloga, S.J. (1999). Soviet/Russian Armor and Artillery Design Practices 1945 to Present. Darlington Productions. .

External links

 FAS
 Btvt.narod.ru in Russian

Anti-tank guided missiles of the Cold War
Anti-tank guided missiles of the Soviet Union
KBP Instrument Design Bureau products
Military equipment introduced in the 1970s